Bolshaya is a rural locality (a village) and the administrative center of Permogorskoye Rural Settlement, Krasnoborsky District, Arkhangelsk Oblast, Russia. The population was 416 as of 2010. There are 16 streets.

Geography 
Bolshaya is located 20 km northwest of Krasnoborsk (the district's administrative centre) by road. Pridvornye Mesta is the nearest rural locality.

References 

Rural localities in Krasnoborsky District